The Amiga CD32 is a 32-bit home video game console developed and manufactured by Commodore International, released in Europe first on September 16, 1993 and later in Australia, Brazil and Canada. It was the third and last programmable console developed under the Commodore brand. The following list contains all of the known games released commercially for the Amiga CD32 platform.

Unveiled at the September's 1993 World of Commodore show, the CD32 is based on the Amiga 1200 and Commodore had plans to distribute the console in the United States at US$399.99 with two pack-in games as well as six separately sold launch games, despite the Commodore CDTV being a failure. However, a deadline was reached for Commodore to pay US$10.000.000 in patent royalty to Cad Track for use of their XOR patent. 

A federal judge ordered an injunction against Commodore that prevented them from importing items into the United States. Commodore had built up a CD32 inventory in their Philippines-based manufacturing facility for the United States launch the consoles remained in Philippines due to the company being unable to sell the system in the region, remaining in the Philippines until the debts owed to the owners of the facility were settled. Commodore declared bankruptcy shortly afterwards, and the CD32 was never officially sold in the United States. Commodore was also not able to meet demand for new units because of component supply problems. Sales of the CD32 in Europe were not enough to save Commodore, and the bankruptcy of Commodore International in April 1994 caused the CD32 to be discontinued only eight months after its debut. During its brief presence on the market, approximately 100,000 Amiga CD32 units of it were sold in Europe alone.

Games 
There are currently  games on this list.

Console Bundles

Compilations

Amiga CD games compatible with CD32

Applications

See also 
 List of Amiga games
 Lists of video games

Notes

References

External links 
 List of Amiga CD32 games at MobyGames

Amiga CD32